Krasae Chanawongse (born 1 March 1934) is a Thai physician, professor of medicine, and politician. He is the recipient of the 1973 Ramon Magsaysay Award for Community Leadership. In 1995, he served as Foreign Minister of Thailand. From 2001 to 2005 he was Minister to the Office of the Prime Minister and advisor of Thaksin Shinawatra.

Early life and education
Krasae Chanawongse was born in Phon District, Khon Kaen Province, in rural Northeastern Thailand, as one of eight siblings in a poor family. After leaving school at age 13 and an unpaid apprenticeship in a lumber shop, he resumed his secondary education while earning money as a delivery boy.  He studied medicine at Chulalongkorn University and the Faculty of Medicine Siriraj Hospital. He graduated with an MD degree in 1960. He added postgraduate studies for a Diploma in Tropical Public Health from the London School of Hygiene & Tropical Medicine in 1967, and took his Doctor of Public Health degree from Columbia University in 1980.

Professional career
From 1960 to 1973, Krasae worked as a physician in Phon. From 1973 to 1975, he led the rural mother and child health program of Khon Kaen province. From 1982 to 1990 he was the director of the ASEAN Institute for Health Development in Bangkok. He was the research and development director of the Naresuan University from 1989 to 1991.

In 1973, Krasae received the Ramon Magsaysay Award in the category "Community Leadership". The awarding foundation honoured his commitment for health care development in one of the least-developed rural regions of the country, citing his "12-year crusade for sanitation, preventive medicine and curative treatment".

Political career
Krasae founded the progressive liberal and moderate left-wing New Force Party in 1974. He was elected Member of Parliament representing Khon Kaen in 1975 and 1976. He was named Deputy Minister of Public Health in 1979, serving in the short-lived cabinet of Kriangsak Chomanan. Having become a member of the Palang Dharma Party in the meantime, he served as Deputy Governor of Bangkok, responsible for health services and public welfare, in 1993.

In 1994, he was appointed Minister of University Affairs in the cabinet of Chuan Leekpai. In February 1995, he switched to the Foreign Ministry, but resigned again as early as in May of the same year. When Palang Dharma leader Thaksin Shinawatra left the party to found his Thai Rak Thai Party, Krasae followed him. Upon becoming Prime Minister in 2001, Thaksin made Krasae Minister to the Office of the Prime Minister. He served in that office for four years.

In 2010, the New York Times considered Krasae a "strong monarchist".

Decorations
 Knight Grand Cordon (Special Class) of the Order of the White Elephant (1994)
 Knight Grand Cordon (Special Class) of the Order of the Crown of Thailand (1995)
 Grand Cordon (First Class) of the Order of the Rising Sun (Japan; 2004)

Works
Rural Health Care in Thailand: an Assessment and Strategies for the Future; Columbia University, 1982
Primary Health Care in Thailand: Theory and Reality; ASEAN Institute for Health Development, Mahidol University, 1985
A Decade of Primary Health Care in ASEAN Member Countries; ASEAN Institute for Health Development, Mahidol University, 1988
Rural Development Management: Principles, Propositions, and Challenges; Research and Development Institute, Khon Kaen University, 1991
Participatory Development in the Context of Southeast Asian Nations; Friedrich Ebert Stiftung, 1998

References

Living people
1934 births
Krasae Chanawongse
Krasae Chanawongse
Krasae Chanawongse
Krasae Chanawongse
Krasae Chanawongse
Krasae Chanawongse
Krasae Chanawongse
Krasae Chanawongse
Ramon Magsaysay Award winners
Columbia University Mailman School of Public Health alumni
Krasae Chanawongse
Krasae Chanawongse
Krasae Chanawongse
Grand Cordons of the Order of the Rising Sun
Krasae Chanawongse